Sofia is a 1987 Argentine drama film directed by Alejandro Doria. It was screened in the Un Certain Regard section at the 1987 Cannes Film Festival.

Cast
 Dora Baret - Sofía
 Héctor Alterio - Pedro's father
 Graciela Dufau - Pedro's mother
 Alejandro Milrud - Pedro
 Nicolas Frei - Silvio Núñez
 Alberto Busaid - Man in train station
 Lito Cruz - Pimp
 Mónica Villa - Prostitute
 Rafael Rodríguez
 Ana Sadi
 Damian Canavezzio
 Marcelo Serre
 Fabián Gianola
 Walter Peña

References

External links

1987 films
1980s Spanish-language films
1987 drama films
Films directed by Alejandro Doria
Argentine drama films
1980s Argentine films